Advantage is the third studio album (second LP) by Clock DVA, released in 1983 by Polydor Records. Singles from it were "Breakdown" and "Resistance". A video was filmed for the song "Resistance", directed by Peter Care.

Track listing

Personnel 
Adapted from the Advantage liner notes.

Clock DVA
 Paul Browse – saxophone
 John Valentine Carruthers – guitar
 Dean Dennis – bass guitar
 Adi Newton – vocals, trumpet, piano (B4), design
 Nick Sanderson – drums, percussion

Additional musicians
 David Heppenstall – cello (B4)
 Katie Kissoon – backing vocals (B2, B3)
Production and additional personnel
 Peter Anderson – photography
 Peter Barrett – design
 Hugh Jones – production, engineering, mixing (B4), keyboards

Release history

References

External links 
 

1983 albums
Clock DVA albums
Albums produced by Hugh Jones (producer)
Polydor Records albums
Albums recorded at Rockfield Studios